The Asociación Iberoamericana de Atletismo (AIA; Iberoamerican Athletics Association) is the governing body for the sport of athletics of European, Latinamerican, and African countries with iberian origin and/or Spanish or Portuguese language. Current president is Oscar Fernández Cáceres from Perú.

History 
AIA was founded on September 14, 1982, in Madrid, Spain.  First president was Juan Manuel de Hoz from Spain.  Founder members were Portugal, Spain, and 20 Latinamerican
countries.  In 1996, AIA was extended by six African countries.  In 2005,
Andorra joined, and last, Aruba was admitted to send athletes for the 2012 Ibero-American Championships.

Championships 
AIA organizes the following championships:
 Ibero-American Championships (Spanish: Campeonato Iberoamericano de Atletismo)
 Ibero-American Marathon/Half Marathon Championships (Spanish: Campeonato Iberoamericano de Maratón/Media Maratón)

Member federations 
There are 30 member federations.

External links
Official website

References

Athletics organizations
Sports organizations established in 1982
Ibero-American Championships in Athletics
1982 establishments in Spain